Tory Rushton (born 1979) is a Canadian politician, who was elected to the Nova Scotia House of Assembly in a byelection on June 19, 2018. A member of the Progressive Conservatives, he represents the electoral district of Cumberland South.

On August 31, 2021, Rushton was made the first Minister of Natural Resources and Renewables.

Electoral record

References

Living people
Progressive Conservative Association of Nova Scotia MLAs
Members of the Executive Council of Nova Scotia
People from Cumberland County, Nova Scotia
1979 births